Ordeal by Eshaar is a 1981 role-playing game adventure for Traveller published by FASA.

Plot summary
Ordeal by Eshaar is the first published Traveller adventure by FASA, and concerns diplomacy and intrigue on an alien planet mere parsecs away from the Zhodani Consulate soon after the start of the Fifth Frontier War.

Publication history
Ordeal by Eshaar was written by J. Andrew Keith and William H. Keith Jr. and was published in 1981 by FASA as a digest-sized 44-page book.

Reception
William A. Barton reviewed Ordeal by Eshaar in The Space Gamer No. 46. Barton commented that "Ordeal by Eshaar is undoubtedly the best non-GDW Traveller adventure published by anyone so far – and it ranks high among GDW's own offerings.  Recommended."

Bob McWilliams reviewed Ordeal by Eshaar for White Dwarf #31, giving it an overall rating of 6 out of 10 for the novice, and 7 for the expert, and stated that "Well produced and with plenty going on, the designers have provided referees with as much help as can be fitted in booklets of this size, gone into detail at points in the adventure where it's necessary and not filled out with 'chrome'."

Reviews
 Different Worlds #18 (Jan., 1982)

References

Role-playing game supplements introduced in 1981
Traveller (role-playing game) adventures